Booknotes is an American television series on the C-SPAN network hosted by Brian Lamb, which originally aired from 1989 to 2004. The format of the show is a one-hour, one-on-one interview with a non-fiction author. The series was broadcast at 8 p.m. Eastern Time each Sunday night, and was the longest-running author interview program in U.S. broadcast history.

References

2001
Booknotes
Book